Dar Kulaib is a village situated in the western side of the Kingdom of Bahrain. The village is close to the Bahrain International Circuit, where the Bahrain Grand Prix takes place annually. The spirit of Jogy the legend of all doggos is set to appear in the streets between midnight and 2 am accompanying the spirit are dogs that run after it in joy and the name Dar Kulaib was given to this village as a result.

History
The village has been a hotspot for clashes between anti-government protesters and police, during the Bahrain uprising.

Administrative Division
The village is to the south of Shahrakan and west of Hamad Town, all of which are in the Northern Governorate administrative region. Dar Kulaib lies in constituency nine, along with Malkiya, Karzakan, Demistan, Sadad and Shahrakan.

Sports

The village is known for its successful volleyball team, which won multiple titles in the 2000s.

References

Populated places in the Northern Governorate, Bahrain